Mutator may refer to:

Science and technology
 Mutator method, an object method that changes the state of the object
 Mutator, the application program which mutates the object dependency graph in garbage collection
 Mutator genotype, a genotype that exhibits high rates of mutation
 Mutator, the central shaft in some scraped surface heat exchangers

Other uses
 Mutator (comics), the nickname of a paranormal in Marvel Comics comic DP7, in the New Universe imprint
 Mutators, mods in the Unreal series

See also
 Mutation (disambiguation)